A Tale of Two Sisters or Tale of Two Sisters may refer to:
 
Tale of Two Sisters, a 1989 American film
A Tale of Two Sisters, a 2003 South Korean horror film
The Uninvited (2009 film), an English language remake of the 2003 Korean film, and originally had the same working title
A Tale of Two Sisters (Once Upon a Time), an episode from the fourth season of American fantasy series Once Upon a Time
A Tale of Two Sisters (TV series), a 2013 South Korean TV series
"A Tale of Two Sisters" is an episode of the animated show Tangled

See also
Janghwa Hongryeon jeon
Two Sisters (disambiguation)